Mangue Seco is a beach village in Jandaíra, Bahia, Brazil. It is famous in Brazil because of a soap-opera (telenovela) adaptation of the novel Tieta do Agreste, by the Brazilian writer Jorge Amado, which was shot on its white beaches in 1996.

Location 
Mangue Seco is located in the northern coast of the state of Bahia, very close to the border with the state of Sergipe. The village lies near the river that marks the border between the two states, the Real River. It is located about 80 km southwest from the city of Aracaju (Sergipe's capital). It can be reached by a 15-min boat trip from three different ports: Porto do Mato, Terra Caida and Pontal.

History
The settlement of what is today Mangue Seco was founded in 1548 by a group of shipwrecked Jesuits, who were the first inhabitants of the village and called it Santa Cruz da Bela Vista. Over the next centuries, it grew into a beach village, which acts as a tourist destination.

Tourism 
The village itself consists of a small fishing village, and has approximately 300 inhabitants. Among the main touristic attractions are the beaches, the buggy trips on the sand dunes and the small, typical Brazilian church.

Landforms of Bahia
Beaches of Brazil
Populated places in Bahia